Norma Kassi (born April 10, 1954) is a native Gwich'in from Yukon Territory, Canada, and a former member of the Yukon Legislative Assembly and former chief of the Vuntut Gwitchin First Nation. She was awarded the Goldman Environmental Prize in 2002, together with Sarah James and Jonathon Solomon. They received the prize for their struggles for protection of the Arctic National Wildlife Refuge (ANWR) from plans of oil exploration and drilling. Oil and gas exploration would disturb the life cycle of the Porcupine caribou, which has been the foundation for the Gwich'in culture for 20,000 years. In 2010 she was elected as Chief of the Vuntut Gwitchin.

References

1954 births
Living people
20th-century First Nations people
21st-century First Nations people
Canadian environmentalists
Canadian women environmentalists
First Nations politicians
First Nations women in politics
Gwich'in people
Women MLAs in Yukon
Yukon New Democratic Party MLAs
Goldman Environmental Prize awardees
20th-century Canadian women politicians